The Church of All Saints is the parish church in the village of Silkstone in South Yorkshire, England. It is a Church of England church in the Diocese of Leeds. The building is Grade I listed and dates back to at least the 12th century.

History
There may have been a church on this site in Saxon times, but the current perpendicular style building was originally constructed in the 12th century. The building was remodelled in 1495, and the chancel was rebuilt in 1852–1858. The church contains a ring of 6 bells.

See also
Grade I listed buildings in South Yorkshire
Listed buildings in Silkstone

References

Grade I listed churches in South Yorkshire
Church of England church buildings in South Yorkshire
12th-century church buildings in England